Günther Bauch (born 30 April 1939) is a German wrestler. He competed in the men's freestyle middleweight at the 1964 Summer Olympics.

References

External links
 

1939 births
Living people
German male sport wrestlers
Olympic wrestlers of the United Team of Germany
Wrestlers at the 1964 Summer Olympics
Sportspeople from Halle (Saale)